Ercan Durmaz (born August 16, 1965) is a Turkish-German actor.

Filmography

Television

References

External links

 
  

1965 births
German people of Turkish descent
German male film actors
German male television actors
Turkish male film actors
Turkish male television actors
Living people
Male actors from Istanbul